ModBase is a database of annotated comparative protein structure models, containing models for more than 3.8 million unique protein sequences. Models are created by the comparative modeling pipeline ModPipe which relies on the MODELLER program. 
ModBase is developed in the laboratory of Andrej Sali at UCSF. ModBase models are also accessible through the Protein Model Portal.

See also
 Homology modeling

References

External links
 http://salilab.org/modbase

Biological databases
Protein methods
Protein structure